Pull Out is a feature documentary directed by Jyllian Gunther, released in 2004. It reflects on Gunther's past relationships and why they failed.

Awards
The film was an "official selection" of the following award organizations:
Hamptons International Film Festival
Raindance Film Festival
Newport International Film Festival

External links
 
Pull Out information at IndieFlix

2004 films
American documentary films
Autobiographical documentary films
2004 documentary films
2000s American films